Hamza Mohamed (born 17 February 1995), nicknamed "Hampu", is a Maldivian footballer who plays as a winger and striker for Maziya.

Career

New Radiant
Mohamed has won the league with New Radiant three times; in 2014, 2015, and 2017.

Maziya 
Mohamed won the league in his first season with the club, in 2019.

Personal life 
Mohamed married his longtime girlfriend, Aishath Shahuma, in November 2019. They had been dating for five years.

Career statistics

Club

International goals

Under–23

Scores and results list Maldives U–23's goal tally first.

Senior team

Scores and results list the Maldives' goal tally first.

Honours

Maldives
SAFF Championship: 2018

References

External links 
 
 
 Hamza –Haveeru Online (archived)
 Oppo & Hampu added (archived)

1995 births
Living people
Maldivian footballers
Maldives international footballers
Footballers at the 2014 Asian Games
Association football forwards
Asian Games competitors for the Maldives
Maziya S&RC players
New Radiant S.C. players